Thomas Aloysius Flaherty (December 21, 1898 – April 27, 1965) was a member of the US House of Representatives from Massachusetts.  Flaherty was born in Boston, Massachusetts, December 21, 1898.  He attended the public schools, Boston College High School and Northeastern University Law School.

He served as a private in the United States Army in 1918. Later he took a job with the United States Veterans' Administration in Boston before he was elected to the Massachusetts House of Representatives in 1934. In 1937, he was elected as a Democrat to the Seventy-fifth Congress to fill the vacancy caused by the resignation of John P. Higgins and was reelected to the next two succeeding Congresses, serving from December 14, 1937, to January 3, 1943. He was not a candidate for renomination in 1942.

Later in his career, he served in positions within the city of Boston including as transit commissioner from 1943 to 1945 and chairman of the Board of Review within the Assessing Department in the city of Boston from 1956 to 1960. Flaherty was also chairman of the Massachusetts Department of Public Utilities from 1946 to 1953 and served as the commissioner from 1953 to 1955. A real estate broker and appraiser, he was a resident of Charlestown, where he died on April 27, 1965. He was interred at Holy Cross Cemetery in Malden, Massachusetts.

See also
 1935–1936 Massachusetts legislature
 1937–1938 Massachusetts legislature

Notes

External links
 

1898 births
1965 deaths
Democratic Party members of the Massachusetts House of Representatives
Democratic Party members of the United States House of Representatives from Massachusetts
20th-century American politicians
Politicians from Boston
Burials in Massachusetts
Boston College High School alumni
Catholics from Massachusetts